Florence Cahn (born 27 October 1954) is a French former figure skater who competed in pairs.

With partner Jean-Pierre Rondel, Cahn finished second at the French Figure Skating Championships in 1968 and 1969.  She then teamed with Jean-Roland Racle and won four straight national championships from 1971 to 1974.  The pair also competed in the 1972 Winter Olympics, finishing 13th.

References
 

1954 births
French female pair skaters
Olympic figure skaters of France
Figure skaters at the 1972 Winter Olympics
Living people